State Route 137 (SR 137) is a state highway in the U.S. state of California, running in the San Joaquin Valley from State Route 43 near Corcoran to State Route 65 in Cairns Corner.

Route description
The western terminus of SR 137 is at an intersection with SR 43 in Corcoran. SR 137 travels east as Whitley Avenue before turning due north as 4th Avenue, which turns into Road 16, and entering Tulare County. The route turns northeast onto Waukena Avenue before passing through the community of Waukena. After this, SR 137 turns north onto Road 30 and then east on Avenue 199 before making another turn north on Road 36. A few miles later, SR 137 makes a final turn east on Avenue 228, which turns into Inyo Avenue. SR 137 continues into the city of Tulare, turning north on M Street and east onto Tulare Avenue as the highway passes through downtown.

SR 137 intersects State Route 99 and the south end of State Route 63 while still in the Tulare city limits. The highway then leaves the city limits and passes through rural Tulare County. The eastern terminus is just west of Lindsay at SR 65.

SR 137 is part of the California Freeway and Expressway System, but is not part of the National Highway System, a network of highways that are considered essential to the country's economy, defense, and mobility by the Federal Highway Administration.

Major intersections

See also

References

External links

Caltrans: Route 137 highway conditions
California Highways: Route 137
California @ AARoads.com - State Route 137

137
State Route 137
State Route 137
State Route 137